Messiah is a British television drama series, broadcast on the BBC One network and produced in-house by BBC Northern Ireland, although the series itself is set in England. Made up of a series of occasional serials, the first, with two parts subtitled The First Killings & The Reckoning, was broadcast in 2001. It has been followed by Messiah 2: Vengeance is Mine (2003),  Messiah III: The Promise (2004), Messiah IV: The Harrowing (2005) and most recently Messiah V: The Rapture (2008). The original production was based on a novel by Boris Starling: the subsequent instalments have been written directly for television. Starling has a cameo as a murder victim's corpse in the first serial.

A crime series, it follows the investigations of DCI Red Metcalfe, who often investigates particularly gruesome murders. Metcalfe is played by Scottish actor Ken Stott, and the other main regulars in the series are Kate Beauchamp (Frances Grey), Duncan Warren (Neil Dudgeon) and Metcalfe's wife Susan (Michelle Forbes). The deafness of Forbes' character necessitated both her and Stott learning British Sign Language for their characters' frequent exchanges.

Cast
 DCI Red Metcalfe (Ken Stott, Series 1–4)
 DCI Joseph Walker (Marc Warren, Series 5)
 DCI Charlie McIntyre (Alun Armstrong, Series 2)
 DCS Michael Emerson (Art Malik, Series 1–2)
 DI Duncan Warren (Neil Dudgeon, Series 1–4)
 DI David Wilby (Vincent Regan, Series 2)
 DI Jack Price (Hugo Speer, Series 4)
 DS Kate Beauchamp (Frances Grey, Series 1–3)
 DS Vickie Clarke (Maxine Peake, Series 4)
 DS Jez Clifton (Jamie Draven, Series 1)
 DS Terry Hedges (Daniel Ryan, Series 5)
 DS Mel Palmer (Marsha Thomason, Series 5)
 Eric Metcalfe (Kieran O'Brien, Series 1–2)
 Susan Metcalfe (Michelle Forbes, Series 1–3)

Production
Messiah I is the only series to be directly adapted from the novel, and deals with a serial killer who sets out to commit twelve murders in the same vein as the Apostles. The screenplay was written by Lizzie Mickery, who also wrote Messiah II and Messiah III. The series was broadcast over a May bank holiday weekend in 2001, on 26 (Saturday) and 27 (Sunday) May respectively. The series does have some major differences to the novel it was adapted from. For example; the final scenes in the novel take place at Easter 1999, traditionally the time when Judas Iscariot hanged himself. However, the events of the final scenes in the series take place on New Year's Eve 2000. In the novel, Red is seen crashing to the floor with his killer before crucifying them, similar to the death of Jesus Christ. However, in the series, Red's killer tries to hang him from his staircase, before Red and his wife manage to overpower him and he falls to his death from a great height. The way in which the killer falls to their death results in them lying on the floor in the shape of a cross. Red meanwhile manages to pull himself to safety. In the novel, Red hands himself in to the police having committed murder, is interviewed by DS Beauchamp and is subsequently sent to jail. However, in the series, Red is seen simply being taken away in a police car to give his side of the story as to how his killer died. Subsequently, he is found to have been at no fault, thus paving the way for the further serials. The novel also shows Red's marriage to his wife, Susan, falling apart and their subsequent split; however, in the series, this does not occur, and Susan appears in two further sequels. Also, it can be noted that the character of Susan is not deaf in the book, but is in the series.

Messiah II was the first original screenplay written for the series, again written by Lizzie Mickery. The plot deals with a serial killer who murders all those implicated in the wrongful imprisonment of their father. The serial was originally scheduled for broadcast on the August bank holiday weekend of 2002, 24 and 25 August respectively, but was pulled at the last moment because of the Soham Murders; it was eventually broadcast in 2003, on 11 and 12 January respectively. Carl Orff's Fortune plango vulnera and O Fortuna were used as trailer music for the series.

Messiah III was again written by Lizzie Mickery. The plot deals with a prison riot, during which a member of Red's team is held hostage and almost killed. A killer then begins to pick off everyone who threatened or harmed that officer. The series was again broadcast across an August bank holiday weekend, being broadcast on 30 and 31 August 2004 respectively. The first two pieces of Orff's Carmina Burana are used in the trailer for the series.

Messiah IV was for the first time written by Terry Cafolla. The plot deals with a killer who commits a series of elaborate and strange murders based around the killings of The Divine Comedy by Dante. The series was once again broadcast across an August bank holiday, but for the first time was split into three parts, being broadcast on 28, 29 and 30 August 2005 respectively.

Messiah V sees Marc Warren take over as lead actor in the series, appearing as new character DCI Joseph Walker. The series, although loosely connected with the four original series, features an entirely new cast, new writer (this series having been written by Oliver Brown), and largely new format. The plot of this series centres around a massacre in a crack den, followed by an acid attack, the murder of two sisters and a victim discovers with a missing heart. The series was broadcast in January 2008, on 20 and 21 January respectively. The first part of the serial was generally positively received by critics, with The Daily Telegraph stating that despite the show lacking the shock value it had when it first started, the variations on the theme are enough to keep it going, and the directing and pacing remained good. The Herald called the show 'stylishly realised', though also asked why professional detectives would need a priest to figure out the serial killer was sending an apocalyptic message. The Guardian called the plot 'totally loopy' but done well, as well as being frightening.

Episodes

Series 1 (2001)

Series 2 (2003)

Series 3 (2004)

Series 4 (2005)

Series 5 (2008)

References

External links 
 
 
 
 
 
 
 Neil Dudgeon website

2000s British drama television series
2001 British television series debuts
BBC television dramas
2008 British television series endings
British Sign Language
Sign language television shows
2000s British crime television series